Zulm Ki Hukumat is a 1992 Bollywood action film starring Dharmendra and Govinda, and directed by Bharat Rangachary.

Plot

Pitamber Koli (Dharmendra) lives a powerful mafia boss existence with his wife and two brothers, Yeshwant and Pratap (Govinda). Pratap is not like the business of his brothers hence he choose another path and lived separately. The trio get in the bad books of another crime boss named Swami, whose offer of drug business is rejected by Pitamber Koli. As a result, Pitamber is killed, and Yeshwant is seriously injured due to firing on them. Pratap takes the place of his elder brother Pitamber and joins the hand with Swami only to avenge the death of his brother. As soon as Swami get to know the true intentions of Pratap, he  makes his move - Pratap's sister and brother-in-law are abducted and held at gunpoint. When Yeshwant goes to rescue them, he is gunned down. Now Pratap, the only remaining Koli brother, is the only target of Swami. How Swami entraps Prat, who will be quite helpless, especially with his sister still a captive with Swami, forms the crux of the story.

Cast

Dharmendra as Pitamber Koli
Moushumi Chatterjee Wife of Pitamber Koli
Govinda as Pratap Koli (Brother of Pitamber)
Kimi Katkar  as Kiran, Pratap's Wife
Shakti Kapoor as Yashwant Koli (Pritamber & Pratap's Brother)
Paresh Rawal as Swami 
Neena Gupta as Yashwant's Wife
Raza Murad as Captain 
Mushtaq Khan as Prabhakar
Amita Nangia as Kusum, Sister of Pitamber and Pratap Koli
Navin Nischol as Kusum Father in Law
Archana Puran Singh as Chitra
Sharat Saxena as Reddy
Amrit Pal as Tandiya
Mahesh Anand as Tandiya's Son
Sudhir Dalvi as Police Commissioner 
Beena Banerjee as Kiran's Mother
Salim Ghouse as Police Inspector Tiger Suryavanshi, friend of Pratap
Dinesh Hingoo as Bahadur, Guest House Manager 
Guddi Maruti as Kiran's Friend
Kishore Bhanushali as Pratap's Friend

Reception
India Today wrote: "Although Dharmendra is a pale shadow of Brando and Govinda tries his best to ape Pacino, this desi godfather comes as a pleasant surprise."

Music
"O Dilruba" was written by Anwar Sagar and the rest were written by Sameer Anjaan.

References

External links
 
 Zulm Ki Hukumat at the Internet Movie Database on Hindilinks4u.biz
 Zulm Ki Hukumat at the Internet Movie Database on hindilinks4u.cc

Zulm Ki Hukumat at the Internet Movie Database on Filmfree4u.online

1992 films
1990s Hindi-language films
Indian crime drama films
Indian action drama films
Films scored by Dilip Sen-Sameer Sen
Films directed by Bharat Rangachary
1990s action drama films
1992 crime drama films